Bauera capitata is a species of flowering plant in the family Cunoniaceae and is endemic to coastal eastern Australia. It is a small shrub with trifoliate, usually lobed leaves and sessile, deep pink flowers with twelve to fifteen stamens.

Description
Flowering occurs in September and October.

Taxonomy
Bauera capitata was first formally described in 1830 by Augustin Pyramus de Candolle in his Prodromus Systematis Naturalis Regni Vegetabilis, from an unpublished description by Nicolas Charles Seringe. The specific epithet (capitata) means "having flowers in heads".

Distribution and habitat
This species of Bauera grows in near-coastal areas from south-eastern Queensland to Port Hacking in New South Wales.

References

Flora of New South Wales
Flora of Queensland
Cunoniaceae
Oxalidales of Australia
Taxa named by Augustin Pyramus de Candolle
Plants described in 1830